North Pekin is a village in Tazewell County, Illinois, United States. The population was 1,573 at the 2010 census. North Pekin is a suburb of Peoria and is part of the Peoria, Illinois Metropolitan Statistical Area.

Geography
North Pekin is located at  (40.611088, -89.624536).

Demographics

As of the census of 2000, there were 1,574 people, 602 households, and 462 families residing in the village. The racial makeup of the village was 97.78% White, 0.44% Native American, 0.64% Asian, 0.06% from other races, and 1.08% from two or more races. Hispanic or Latino of any race were 0.38% of the population.

There were 602 households, out of which 34.7% had children under the age of 18 living with them, 61.3% were married couples living together, 10.6% had a female householder with no husband present, and 23.1% were non-families. 18.9% of all households were made up of individuals, and 7.8% had someone living alone who was 65 years of age or older. The average household size was 2.61 and the average family size was 2.95.

In the village, the population was spread out, with 25.9% under the age of 18, 8.9% from 18 to 24, 29.9% from 25 to 44, 23.4% from 45 to 64, and 12.0% who were 65 years of age or older. The median age was 36 years. For every 100 females, there were 99.7 males. For every 100 females age 18 and over, there were 101.2 males.

The median income for a household in the village was $41,375, and the median income for a family was $44,013. Males had a median income of $37,734 versus $19,821 for females. The per capita income for the village was $18,072. About 8.4% of families and 8.4% of the population were below the poverty line, including 14.5% of those under age 18 and 2.6% of those age 65 or over.

References

Villages in Tazewell County, Illinois
Villages in Illinois
Peoria metropolitan area, Illinois